23rd NSFC Awards
January 9, 1989

Best Film: 
 The UnbearableLightness of Being 
The 23rd National Society of Film Critics Awards, given on 9 January 1989, honored the best filmmaking of 1988.

Winners

Best Picture 
1. The Unbearable Lightness of Being
2. Women on the Verge of a Nervous Breakdown (Mujeres al borde de un ataque de nervios)
3. Wings of Desire (Der Himmel über Berlin)
3. A World Apart

Best Director 
1. Philip Kaufman – The Unbearable Lightness of Being
2. Chris Menges – A World Apart
3. Wim Wenders – Wings of Desire (Der Himmel über Berlin)

Best Actor 
1. Michael Keaton – Beetlejuice and Clean and Sober
2. Gene Hackman – Mississippi Burning
3. Dustin Hoffman – Rain Man
3. Max von Sydow – Pelle the Conqueror (Pelle erobreren)

Best Actress 
1. Judy Davis – High Tide
2. Carmen Maura – Women on the Verge of a Nervous Breakdown (Mujeres al borde de un ataque de nervios)
3. Melanie Griffith – Working Girl
3. Barbara Hershey – A World Apart

Best Supporting Actor 
1. Dean Stockwell – Married to the Mob and Tucker: The Man and His Dream
2. Alec Guinness – Little Dorrit
3. Tim Robbins – Bull Durham

Best Supporting Actress 
1. Mercedes Ruehl – Married to the Mob
2. Lena Olin – The Unbearable Lightness of Being
3. Michelle Pfeiffer – Dangerous Liaisons

Best Screenplay 
1. Ron Shelton – Bull Durham
2. David Cronenberg and Norman Snider – Dead Ringers
3. Shawn Slovo – A World Apart

Best Cinematography 
1. Henri Alekan – Wings of Desire (Der Himmel über Berlin)2. Sven Nykvist – The Unbearable Lightness of Being3. Philippe Rousselot – Dangerous Liaisons3. Conrad L. Hall – Tequila Sunrise3. Vittorio Storaro – Tucker: The Man and His Dream Best Documentary 
1. The Thin Blue Line2. Hôtel Terminus: The Life and Times of Klaus Barbie3. Tokyo Olympiad (Tôkyô orimpikku'')

Special Award 
Pedro Almodóvar

References

External links
Past Awards

1988
National Society of Film Critics Awards
National Society of Film Critics Awards
National Society of Film Critics Awards